The Moscow Academic Theatre of Satire is a dramatic theatre in Moscow, Russia, established in 1924.

References

External links
 

Theatre companies in Russia
Theatres in Moscow